Jonathan Alberto Novoa Tiznado (born 21 August 1981) was a Chilean footballer and current manager. His last club as professional player was Rangers. 

He was born in Talcahuano, Chile.

References
 Profile at BDFA 
 

1981 births
Living people
Chilean footballers
Primera B de Chile players
Chilean Primera División players
C.D. Arturo Fernández Vial footballers
O'Higgins F.C. footballers
C.D. Antofagasta footballers
San Marcos de Arica footballers
Puerto Montt footballers
C.D. Huachipato footballers
Association football forwards
People from Talcahuano